Wall Street English (formerly Wall Street Institute) is an international English language learning academy
for children and adults around the world. Wall Street English was established in 1972 in Italy by Italian Luigi Tiziano Peccenini.
The company has over 3 million alumni with a current enrolment of 180,000 students. Using a franchise model, they currently operate over 450 centers in 28 countries in North Africa, East Asia, Southeast Asia, Europe, Latin America, and the Middle East.  Its international offices are in Hong Kong and in Barcelona, Spain.

In 2013, Wall Street Institute launched a company-wide rebranding, changing its name and identity. The company now operates as Wall Street English.

The Wall Street English program is designed for all levels of learners. They have 20 different levels of English language courses ranging from beginner to advanced. Their program includes an English-only environment in their centers,  native English-speaking teachers, social activities that allow students to practice English in a social, non-threatening environment, and a global online student community.

The Wall Street English Blended Learning Method, created by Luigi Tiziano Peccenini and Luciano Biondo,  combines different education methods of acquiring a language into one study cycle. The Blended Learning Method includes self-study, small teacher-led classes, and practice time.  Students listen, read, write, speak, and practice English to gain a deep understanding of the language.

Wall Street English has been teaching English since 1972. Their curriculum is aligned to the Common European Framework of Reference for Languages (CEFR), according to a study undertaken with the support of the University of Cambridge English for Speakers of Other Languages Examination group (ESOL).

History
The first Wall Street Institute centers opened in Italy in 1972, and within two years 24 new centers opened across Italy. In 1983, Wall Street Institute expanded outside of Italy, and by the late 1980s Wall Street Institute was well established across Europe. Expansion continued through the early 1990s, when centers were opened in Mexico, Chile, and Venezuela. Beginning in the late 1990s, Wall Street Institute expanded into the Middle East and then to Asia, which has grown to be a significant part of its business.

In 1997, Wall Street Institute was purchased by Sylvan Learning Systems. In 2005, Wall Street Institute was acquired by the global private equity firm The Carlyle Group. Wall Street English was acquired by Pearson plc from an affiliate of The Carlyle Group and Citic Private Equity for $92 million in cash in 2010. In 2017 Pearson sold it to Baring Private Equity Asia and CITIC Capital for around $300 million.

In 2013, the company launched a rebranding and introduced a new logo and united under one global name: Wall Street English.

It operated more than 70 centers in China. China was the biggest market for Wall Street English. In August 2021, the company announced the bankruptcy of its Chinese subsidiary.

Corporate affairs
The Wall Street English international office is located in Barcelona, Spain.

Previously its headquarters was in Baltimore.

By country and region
Wall Street English has centers in: Algeria, Argentina, Chile, Colombia, Czech Republic, Ecuador, France, Hong Kong SAR, Indonesia, Israel, Italy, Malaysia, Mexico, Morocco, Myanmar, Peru, Portugal, Russia, Saudi Arabia, South Korea, Spain, Switzerland, Thailand, Tunisia, Turkey, Venezuela, Cambodia and Vietnam.

Argentina
There are 7 Wall Street English centers in Buenos Aires and 2 in Buenos Aires Province.

Chile
In Chile, Wall Street English operates 13 centers.  From La Serena, down through Puerto Montt.

Colombia
Wall Street English in Colombia has 16 centers: 12 in Bogotá, 2 in Medellín, and one each in Barranquilla and Bucaramanga.

Czech Republic
Wall Street English has one center in Prague, Czech Republic.

Ecuador
Wall Street English has had centers in Ecuador since 1999. The current 9 centers include: Ambato, Azogues, Cuenca, Guayaquil, Ibarra, La Prensa, Loja, Los Chillos,  Orellana, Santo Domingo, Tumbaco, and Villaflora.

France
Wall Street English operates 50 centers in France, of which 5 are located in Paris. In January 2018, the biggest French center ranked number one in the world in terms of sales

Germany
There were 24 Wall Street English centers in Germany until 2016. Four of which are in Berlin, three in Munich, and the rest in Bonn, Bremen, Dortmund, Düsseldorf, Essen, Frankfurt, Hamburg, Hanover, Karlsruhe, Cologne, Leipzig, Mannheim, Nuremberg, Stuttgart, and Wiesbaden.

Wall Street English announced on 6 April 2016 that it would be closing operations in Germany on a permanent basis.

Hong Kong
Wall Street English currently has 7 educational centers in Hong Kong: in Causeway Bay, Jordan, Tsuen Wan, Kwun Tong, Shatin, Yuen Long and Tseung Kwan O. All centers have been registered with the Education Bureau of Hong Kong.

Indonesia
In Indonesia, Wall Street English has centers in Jakarta at Pacific Place, Mall Kelapa Gading, Gandaria City Mall, Kota Kasablanka. In Tangerang at Living World. In Bandung in a stand-alone center: Wall Street English Dago. And in Surabaya at Pakuwon Mall. In 2020, Wall Street English Indonesia launched its 100% online membership.

Israel
In Israel there is 1 center in Tel Aviv and Online.

Italy
Wall Street English was first established in Italy, where there are currently 95 centers.

Malaysia
The Wall Street English center in Malaysia is situated in the commercial center of Kuala Lumpur and there are 4 centers nationwide.

Mongolia
Wall Street English has two centers located in Ulaanbaatar.

Morocco
Wall Street English has one center located in Casablanca.

Mexico
Wall Street English has 2 centers in Mexico City.

Myanmar
Wall Street English opened its first center at the Junction Square Shopping Centre in Yangon, Myanmar in February 2017. A second center was subsequently opened in December 2017 at City Mall @ St. John in Yangon.  A third center was opened at Myanmar Plaza, also in Yangon, in August 2018.

Peru
Wall Street English has two centers in Lima.

Portugal
Wall Street English has 35 centers across Portugal.

Russia
Wall Street English has zero centers in Moscow. Previous centers are permanently closed.

Saudi Arabia
Wall Street English has 25 centers in Saudi Arabia: in Jeddah, Riyadh, Qatif, Khobar, Medina, Jazan, Abha, Ta'if, Jazan, Makkah, Najran, Khamees Mesheet, and Buraydah Tabuk.

South Korea

Wall Street English has 9 centers in South Korea: in Seoul (Samseong, Jongno, Shinchon, Gangnam, Yeouido), Gyeonggi Province (Bundang, Ilsan), Daegu, and Busan.

Spain
There are four Wall Street English center in Spain. They are located in Barcelona, Cartagena, Valencia and Terrassa.

Switzerland
There are 8 Wall Street English centers in Switzerland: Biel/Bienne, Fribourg/Freiburg, Geneva, La Chaux-de-Fonds, Lausanne, Lugano, Montreux and Neuchâtel.

Thailand
In Thailand, Wall Street English first opened in Silom in Bangkok, in July 2003. Centers in Sukhumvit, Lad Prao, Siam, and Pinklao followed. In 2008, the Sukhumvit branch was moved to Seacon Square. In January 2011, Fashion Island Branch opened, and in March 2011, Future Park Rangsit branch opened. In 2012, new centers opened in Mega Bangna and Central World. There are also 8 Corporate centers located inside the offices of large companies, such as TOT, KPMG, and SCB.

Tunisia
There are 4 centers in Tunis: El Menzah 6, Lac 1, Ghazela, Megrine .

Turkey
There are 16 centers in Turkey: six in Istanbul (at Bakırköy, Caddebostan, Şişli, Erenköy, Taksim and Beylikdüzü). There are three centers in Ankara (Kızılay, Çayyolu and Ostim), İzmit, Bursa, Eskişehir, Izmir, Antalya, Gaziantep, and Konya.

Venezuela
There are 5 centers in Venezuela.

Vietnam
There are seven Wall Street English centers operating in Vietnam—presently only in Ho Chi Minh City. These centers are located in District 3, District 2, Tan Binh District, District 5, District 7, Go Vap District, with the most recent addition being BBD Binh Duong Center in Binh Duong Province, Thu Dau Mot City. In 2020, Wall Street English Vietnam was acquired by Asia Strategic Holdings.  This had a significant impact on WSE Vietnam and has resulted in many personnel and organizational changes.

References

External links

Wall Street English – International

English-language education
Pearson plc
Companies established in 1972
1997 mergers and acquisitions
2005 mergers and acquisitions
2010 mergers and acquisitions